John Angerstein (c. 1774 – 8 April 1858) was an English Whig politician from Blackheath, London.

He was the only son of John Julius Angerstein, who had moved to London from Russia and made his fortune as a Lloyds underwriter.

He was elected at the 1796 general election as a Member of Parliament (MP) for borough of Camelford in Cornwall, holding the seat until the 1802 general election, when he left Parliament.

He was one of the three people nominated in November 1829 to be the High Sheriff of Kent for 1830–31, but the King picked Edward Rice instead. He was nevertheless appointed High Sheriff of Norfolk for 1831–32, when he lived at Weeting Hall.

He was re-elected to Parliament at the 1835 general election as an MP for Greenwich,
having previously contested the seat unsuccessfully in 1832. He decided not to defend the seat at the 1837 general election, choosing instead to stand for Eastern Surrey. He failed to win that seat however.

He died in 1858. He had married Amelia, the daughter of William Lock of Norbury Park, Surrey, with whom he had 3 sons and 2 daughters.

References

External links 
 

1770s births
People from Blackheath, London
Whig (British political party) MPs for English constituencies
Members of the Parliament of Great Britain for constituencies in Cornwall
British MPs 1796–1800
Members of the Parliament of the United Kingdom for English constituencies
UK MPs 1835–1837
High Sheriffs of Norfolk
People from Breckland District
1858 deaths